Louis Munier (21 November 1821 in Gex, Ain – 7 July 1896 in Paris) was a French politician.

He was a city councillor, then a first deputy mayor in Lyon. From 1882 to 1896, he was a senator of the Rhône department within the Republican Union group. He was also the mayor of Beausemblant, Drôme, where he is buried.

In 1850, he married Marie Vinay in Beausemblant. They had two children: Paul Munier, who was admitted to the Court of Appeal of Lyon, and Jeanne Munier, who married Adrien Audibert, a law professor in Lyon and then Paris.

Sources 
 
 Jean Jolly (dir.), Dictionnaire des parlementaires français, Presses universitaires de France

External links 
 

1821 births
1896 deaths
People from Gex, Ain
French city councillors
French Senators of the Third Republic
Senators of Rhône (department)
Mayors of places in Auvergne-Rhône-Alpes